Calliostoma lividum is a species of sea snail, a marine gastropod mollusk in the family Calliostomatidae.

Distribution
This species occurs in the following locations:
 Azores Exclusive Economic Zone

References

External links
 To Barcode of Life
 To World Register of Marine Species

lividum
Gastropods described in 1927